Lumang Gewog (Dzongkha: ཀླུ་མང་) is a gewog (village block) of Trashigang District, Bhutan. Lumang and Khaling Gewogs comprise Wamrong Dungkhag (sub-district).

References 

Gewogs of Bhutan
Trashigang District